Aleksei Leonov (born 25 March 1987) is a Russian Paralympic archer. Leonov and Elena Krutova won the bronze medal in the mixed team W1 event at the 2020 Summer Paralympics held in Tokyo, Japan.

References

External links
 

Living people
1987 births
Russian male archers
Archers at the 2020 Summer Paralympics
Medalists at the 2020 Summer Paralympics
Paralympic bronze medalists for the Russian Paralympic Committee athletes
Paralympic medalists in archery
Paralympic archers of Russia
Sportspeople from Astrakhan
21st-century Russian people